Jang Hong-won (born 21 May 1990) is a South Korean former footballer.

Career statistics

Club

Notes

References

1990 births
Living people
South Korean footballers
Association football goalkeepers
Bucheon FC 1995 players
Home United FC players
Singapore Premier League players
South Korean expatriate sportspeople in Singapore
Expatriate footballers in Singapore